Dan McCrum (born 1978/1979) is an English journalist who is an investigative journalist for the Financial Times, having joined the newspaper in 2007. He is best-known for his investigation into the Wirecard scandal between 2014 and 2020.

Career
According to McCrum's personal website, he had worked as a paperboy at a newsagent's shop owned by his family, and lives with them in St Albans.

McCrum graduated from Durham University with a bachelors in economics and politics in 2001. After his graduation, he worked at Citigroup as part of its equity research department. He began writing for the Investors Chronicle in 2006, and joined the Financial Times in 2007 as a reporter. Early in his Financial Times career, McCrum covered the 2007–2008 financial crisis and the Madoff investment scandal from New York as the paper's US investment correspondent. In 2011, he joined the FT Alphaville team, writing for the commentary until 2015.

Wirecard scandal
In summer 2014, McCrum received a tip from a hedge fund manager John Hempton on potential fraud at Wirecard, a German financial services firm. Following an investigation, McCrum noticed a number of acquisitions of obscure Asian firms by Wirecard. After a trip to Manama, Bahrain found an apparent local client of Wirecard to be bogus, McCrum brought his findings back to Alphaville. His initial findings were published in 2015. In response to the publication, Wirecard executive Jan Marsalek arranged several meetings with Alphaville founder Paul Murphy, attempting to persuade Murphy to prevent further investigation into Wirecard.

In 2018, McCrum received 70 GBs of leaked email correspondence from a former Wirecard lawyer. After analysing the acquired information for several months, his findings were published on 30 January 2019. The publication, and a follow-up article, resulted in Wirecard's valuation falling by €8 billion, with the German Federal Financial Supervisory Authority banning the short selling of Wirecard stock and German prosecutors opening investigations into the Financial Times. During this period, McCrum continued investigating Wirecard's claimed Asian clients along with Singapore correspondent Stephania Palma. Another story related to the newer investigation was published on 28 March, and on 15 October, the paper had published an article directly accusing Wirecard of committing fraud. Prosecutors based in Munich opened an investigation into McCrum and Palma, who were accused of market manipulation regarding the investigation. In the following year, as auditors scrutinised the company, the scale of the fraud became public and Wirecard declared bankruptcy in 2020. According to later German investigators, it was the largest case of financial fraud in the country's history. McCrum also testified before a German parliamentary committee regarding the scandal in 2020. The investigation into McCrum and Palma was dropped in September 2020.

McCrum was later named Journalist of the Year in 2020 by the Press Gazette for his role in the Wirecard investigation. He published his accounts of the investigation as a book in 2022, and the investigation was subject to a documentary at Netflix.

Other works 

McCrum has also written investigative pieces on accounting issues at UK law firm Quindell and Greek firm Folli Follie.

References

Financial Times people
Alumni of Durham University
British investigative journalists
1970s births
Living people
People from St Albans